Jean Emile Oosterlynck (1915–1996) was a Belgian (Flemish) painter who was born in Paris because of World War I. He studied at Courtrai and Anvers in Belgium. Influenced by Paul Klee, Oosterlynck looked to objects for their symbolic value – the dome of Sacre-Cœur against the Paris night sky, shuttered windows, the flutter of two birds in an embrace, the simple objects of a still life. His colors were strong and his objects are disposed in semi-abstract arrangements. An ability to create an image that imposes itself on the memory is perhaps his greatest gift. Oosterlynck lived in Belgium until 1979, when he moved to and lived in Majorca, Spain, until his death.

References 

1915 births
1996 deaths
20th-century Belgian painters
Artists from Paris
Belgian expatriates in France